Flammarion is a lunar impact crater on the south edge of Sinus Medii. Its diameter is 76 km. It is named after the French astronomer Camille Flammarion. It is located between the crater Mösting to the northwest and Herschel to the southeast. The bowl-shaped Mösting A intersects the western rim of Flammarion.

The worn outer wall of Flammarion is broken in the northwest, and the remainder is eroded and damaged. The most intact section of the wall lies to the southeast. A rille designated Rima Flammarion lies across the gap in the northwest rim, extending about 80 kilometers to the west-southwest. The crater floor has been flooded by lava, and is relatively smooth with only a few scattered craterlets to mark the surface.

Satellite craters
By convention these features are identified on lunar maps by placing the letter on the side of the crater midpoint that is closest to Flammarion.

See also 
 Flammarion (Martian crater)
 1021 Flammario, asteroid

References

External links

Flammarion at the Moon Wiki
Rima Flammarion at the Moon Wiki
 

Impact craters on the Moon